is a Japanese football player currently playing for Nara Club.

Career 
He previously played for Consadole Sapporo and Kashiwa Reysol.

Club stats
Updated to 30 November 2018.

Honours
Albirex Niigata Singapore
Singapore League Cup: 2011

References

External links

Profile at Ehime FC
Profile at Blaublitz Akita

1989 births
Living people
Association football people from Chiba Prefecture
Japanese footballers
J1 League players
J2 League players
J3 League players
Japan Football League players
Hokkaido Consadole Sapporo players
Albirex Niigata Singapore FC players
Blaublitz Akita players
Ehime FC players
Nara Club players
Japanese expatriate footballers
Expatriate footballers in Singapore
Expatriate footballers in Thailand
Japanese expatriate sportspeople in Singapore
Japanese expatriate sportspeople in Thailand
Association football defenders